The 2010–11 Nigeria Premier League was the 40th season of the competition since its inception, and the 21st since the rebranding of the league as the "Professional League". Enyimba International were the defending champions.

The season was originally supposed to start 25 September, then was delayed to 2 October. However after a series of meetings and threatened lawsuits, the league announced that it would play with 24 teams, including the four teams relegated from the previous season. The tentative compromise plans included two divisions of 12 teams each with the top two making the season-ending Super Four, mirroring the league's format in the 2006 and 2007 seasons. This idea was canceled by the NPL on October 7 and the league returned to 20 teams for the season.

The season was delayed again to start the weekend of 23 October, and delayed yet again to 6 November because of issues with the assignment of referees.
Due to enforcement of minimum pitch standards, several teams have been made to play in different stadiums outside their home cities.

The second half of the season began 11 May after a six-week break, including two delays for national elections. The season was finished on 13 November 2011 after another six-week delay to allow for the Federation Cup and teams playing on the continent to concentrate on their fixtures.

Clubs

League table

Personnel and kits

News
 December 12- Ocean Boys defender Emmanuel Okoli collapsed 39 minutes into a game vs. Niger Tornadoes and died en route to the hospital.
 December 16- The league was named the "MTN Premier League" after the NFF secured sponsorship from the MTN Group. However sponsorship was rescinded January 27 and the bidding was reopened.
 January 8- In Abeokuta, Shooting Stars and Tornadoes played the first night game in Nigeria's top division in twenty-nine years.
 Due to unrest in the city of Jos, on January 13 JUTH announced they were moving home games to Kaduna and Plateau United were going to play in Enugu for one month.

Managerial (head coach) changes

References

External links
Nigeria Premier League at FIFA.com
Naija League

Nigeria Professional Football League seasons
Nigeria
1